The Fowl Twins is the first novel in Eoin Colfer's The Fowl Twins series, a spin-off and continuation of the Artemis Fowl series and second cycle of The Fowl Adventures, following Myles and Beckett Fowl, the younger twin brothers of criminal mastermind Artemis Fowl II. The Fowl Twins was released 5 November 2019 by Viking Press and Disney Hyperion, promoting the then-upcoming Artemis Fowl film adaptation for Disney+. The novel was well-received by critics, with reviews comparing its quality and success to that of the original series.

Plot synopsis
Criminal genius runs in the family. Myles and Beckett Fowl are twins but the two boys are wildly different. Beckett is blonde, messy and sulks whenever he has to wear clothes. Myles is impeccably neat, has an IQ of 170, and 3D prints a fresh suit every day - just like his older brother, Artemis Fowl. A week after their eleventh birthday the twins are left in the care of house security system, NANNI, for a single night. In that time, they befriend a troll on the run from a nefarious nobleman and an interrogating nun both of whom need the magical creature for their own gain . . . Prepare for an epic adventure in which The Fowl Twins and their new troll friend escape, get shot at, kidnapped, buried, arrested, threatened, killed (temporarily) . . . and discover that the strongest bond in the world is not the one forged by covalent electrons in adjacent atoms, but the one that exists between a pair of twins.

Background
Colfer stated writing Artemis Fowl and the Last Guardian that he had had "enough" with the series, opting to take a "breather" from it in favor of other projects, stating with regards the writing of The Fowl Twins that "[i]t would probably be a lot easier if I was on Artemis 15 by now. I just find I get bored, and if I get bored, the work suffers", having decided to return to the Fowl series after having "had too many stories running around in [his] head to ignore", referencing that while it is "not very Irish to be proud of something, but I started to feel a pride in the [Fowl] world. I'm kind of a curmudgeon, really, but I went back into it more positively." Colfer cited Carysfort College as the inspiration for Spanish antagonistic spy-nun Sister Jeronima.

Reception
Critical reception for The Fowl Twins was positive, meeting with praise from most reviewers. Kirkus Reviews praised the book, writing that: "Like its bestselling progenitors, [The Fowl Twins] is a nonstop spinoff afroth with high tech, spectacular magic, and silly business." The Times praised the novel as "another wildly imaginative adventure" from Colfer, in particular the "widly different natures" of the titular Fowl twins and how they "drive the story", while The Chicago Tribune acknowledged the novel as the "best children's book of 2019". The Tampa Bay Times complimented the novel's character dynamics as "a little magical mayhem" for those who feel "[the] real world is getting on your nerves".

References

External links
 Official website
 Official UK website
 Official webpage

2019 Irish novels
Artemis Fowl books
2019 fantasy novels
Science fantasy novels
2019 children's books
Irish fantasy novels
Novels about artificial intelligence